Deathstalker is a science fiction novel by British author Simon R. Green.

The second in a series of nine novels, Deathstalker is part homage to - and part parody of - the classic space operas of the 1950s, and deals with the timeless themes of honour, love, courage and betrayal.

Plot introduction

Set in a far-future fictional universe, Deathstalker follows the life of Owen Deathstalker, a minor aristocrat and historian, as he is catapulted from a life of quiet luxury and academic pursuit into a galaxy-wide rebellion against the empire in which he lives.

Sources, references, external links, footnotes
 

1995 British novels
British science fiction novels